Edmund B. Lewinski (September 10, 1918 – April 15, 1962) was an American professional basketball player. He played for the Chicago American Gears, Anderson Duffey Packers, and Tri-Cities Blackhawks in the National Basketball League and averaged 4.8 points per game.

Lewinski also played minor league baseball. He played for the following teams:
 1946: Decatur Commodores and Winston-Salem Cardinals
 1947: Houston Buffaloes and Omaha Cardinals
 1948: Omaha Cardinals
 1949: Miami Beach Flamingos
 1950: Florence Steelers and Miami Beach Flamingos
 1951: Augusta Tigers, Miami Beach Flamingos, and Lake Charles Lakers

References

1918 births
1962 deaths
Amateur Athletic Union men's basketball players
United States Army personnel of World War II
American men's basketball players
Anderson Packers players
Augusta Tigers players
Baseball players from Chicago
Basketball players from Chicago
Centers (basketball)
Chicago American Gears players
Decatur Commodores players
Florence Steelers players
Forwards (basketball)
Houston Buffaloes players
Lake Charles Lakers players
Miami Beach Flamingos players
Omaha Cardinals players
Tri-Cities Blackhawks players
Winston-Salem Cardinals players